Monte San Cristoforo is a mountain of southern San Marino. It is located between the towns of Fiorentino and Montegiardino, and rises to a height of 534 metres.

References 

Mountains of San Marino